These are the premier International Bowls Events between national bowls organisations affiliated to World Bowls, the PBA, World Bowls Tour and the IIBC.

World Outdoor Bowls Championships

Organised by World Bowls. First held in 1966, the World Outdoor Bowls Championships for men and women are held every 4 years. From 2008 the men's and women's events are held together. Qualifying national bowls organisations (usually countries) are represented by a team of 5 players, who play once as a single and a four, then again as a pair and a triple. Gold, silver, and bronze medals are awarded in each of the 4 disciplines, and there is also a trophy for the best overall team — the Leonard Trophy for men and the Taylor Trophy for women.

Commonwealth Games

Organised by the Commonwealth Games Federation. First held in 1930, the Commonwealth Games Bowls Championships for men and women are held every 4 years. Women's events were added from 1982. Four gold medals are competed for in the singles, pairs, triples and fours.

World Indoor Bowls Championships

Organised by the PBA/World Bowls Tour. First held in 1979, the World Indoor Bowls Championships for men and women are held every year. There are currently five events, the open singles, the open pairs, the women's singles, the mixed pairs and open under-25 singles. It is currently organised by the Professional Bowls Association and the World Bowls Tour and involves mainly Northern Hemisphere nations.

World Bowls Indoor Championship

Organised jointly by World Bowls and the IIBC. A new event starting in 2022 (a merger of the former World Cup Singles and IIBC championships. Rival competition to the PBA and WBT event listed above.

World Singles Champion of Champions

Organised by World Bowls. A leading outdoor event held annually between the winners of the respective National Championships.

Pacific Games

Organised by Pacific Games Council. A leading outdoor event held every four years between the Pacific Islands nations as part of the Pacific Games.

Southeast Asian Games

Organised by Southeast Asian Games Federation. A leading outdoor event held every two years between the Southeast Asian nations as part of the Southeast Asian Games.

Asian Lawn Bowls Championship

Organised by World Bowls. A leading outdoor event held annually between the Asian nations.

European Bowls Championships

Organised by Bowls Europe Ltd. A leading outdoor event held annually between European nations.

National Championships

Other leading events
Hong Kong International Bowls Classic
Asia Pacific Bowls Championships (former)
Atlantic Bowls Championships (former)
World Cup Singles (former)

Calendar

References